Duo Airways was an airline based in the United Kingdom. Its main bases were Birmingham Airport and Edinburgh Airport. It ceased operations in May 2004.

History 
The airline was formed by a management buyout of the former Maersk UK in June 2003. The airline relaunched services in November 2003 but a shortage of funds led to it suspending flights and entering administration on 1 May 2004.

The airline sought to provide a high quality of service at moderate prices, but faced a marketing challenge in explaining that it was not a low cost, no-frills carrier, and load factors took longer than expected to reach budgeted levels. Despite overwhelmingly positive reaction from passengers and an encouraging outlook, the airline had to close down when an investor withdrew support at short notice.

Destinations 

Duo Airways served the following destinations throughout operations:

Fleet 
The Duo Airways fleet consisted of the following aircraft through operations:

See also
 List of defunct airlines of the United Kingdom

External links 
 Duo Airways Former Fleet Detail
 Photos of Duo Airways aircraft
 History of Duo Airways and its predecessors (in German)

Defunct airlines of the United Kingdom
Airlines established in 2003
Airlines disestablished in 2004